Impose is an American Kansas-based website covering independent music and related culture. It was founded in 2002 as a magazine by Brooklyn, New York-based Derek Evers as a print-only magazine, and has since expanded to include a website and an affiliated record label. Since 2008, it has stopped printing a magazine.

In April 2016, the brand and website was sold to Kansas-based company Answer Media.

References

External links

Impose Magazine Tenth Anniversary, the New Yorker

Defunct magazines published in the United States
Magazines established in 2002
Magazines disestablished in 2008
Magazines published in Kansas
Music magazines published in the United States
Online magazines with defunct print editions
Online music magazines published in the United States